Serlopitant (INN, codenamed VPD-737) is a drug which acts as an NK1 receptor antagonist. It was assessed in clinical trials for the treatment of urinary incontinence and overactive bladder, but while it was superior to placebo it provided no advantage over existing approved drugs, and was not approved for further development for this indication. Serlopitant is now undergoing clinical trials for the treatment of chronic pruritus (itch)

See also 
 NK1 receptor antagonist

References 

NK1 receptor antagonists
Trifluoromethyl compounds
Fluoroarenes